Death Valley Outlaws is a 1941 American Western film directed by George Sherman and written by Jack Lait Jr. and Don Ryan. The film stars Don "Red" Barry, Lynn Merrick, Milburn Stone, Bob McKenzie, Karl Hackett and Rex Lease. The film was released on September 26, 1941, by Republic Pictures.

Plot

Cast 
Don "Red" Barry as Johnny Edwards
Lynn Merrick as Carolyn Johnson
Milburn Stone as Jeff
Bob McKenzie as Doc Blake 
Karl Hackett as Charles W. Gifford
Rex Lease as Marshal Jim Collins
Jack Kirk as Tom Johnson
Michael Owen as Bill Westen
Fred Toones as Snowflake

References

External links
 

1941 films
1940s English-language films
American Western (genre) films
1941 Western (genre) films
Republic Pictures films
Films directed by George Sherman
American black-and-white films
1940s American films